Midnight Cowboy is a 1969 American drama film, based on the 1965 novel of the same name by James Leo Herlihy. The film was written by Waldo Salt, directed by John Schlesinger, and stars Dustin Hoffman and Jon Voight, with notable smaller roles being filled by Sylvia Miles, John McGiver, Brenda Vaccaro, Bob Balaban, Jennifer Salt, and Barnard Hughes. Set in New York City, Midnight Cowboy depicts the unlikely friendship between two hustlers: naïve sex worker Joe Buck (Voight), and ailing con man Enrico "Rico" Rizzo (Hoffman), referred to as "Ratso".

At the 42nd Academy Awards, the film won three awards: Best Picture, Best Director and Best Adapted Screenplay. Midnight Cowboy is the only X-rated film ever to win Best Picture. It has since been placed 36th on the American Film Institute's list of the 100 greatest American films of all time, and 43rd on its 2007 updated version.

In 1994, Midnight Cowboy was deemed "culturally, historically or aesthetically significant" by the Library of Congress and selected for preservation in the United States National Film Registry.

Plot
Young Texan dishwasher Joe Buck quits his job and heads by bus to New York City in cowboy attire to become a male prostitute. Initially unsuccessful, he finally beds a middle-aged woman, Cass, in her Park Avenue apartment. She is insulted when he requests payment and he ultimately gives her money, implying she is a high-class prostitute herself.

Joe meets Rico "Ratso" Rizzo, a con man with a limp who takes $20 for introducing him to a pimp. After discovering that the alleged pimp is actually an unhinged religious fanatic, Joe flees unsuccessfully in pursuit of Rico. Joe spends his days wandering the city listening to his Zenith portable radio and sitting in his hotel room. Soon broke, management locks him out and impounds his belongings.

Joe tries to make money by receiving oral sex from a young man in a movie theater, but the man cannot pay. Joe threatens him, but releases him unharmed. The next day, Joe spots Rico and angrily confronts him. When Rico offers to share his apartment squat in a condemned building, Joe reluctantly accepts, and they begin a "business relationship" as hustlers. Rico asks Joe to refer to him as "Rico" instead of "Ratso", but Joe does not oblige. They struggle with severe poverty, stealing food while failing to get Joe work, and Joe pawns his radio. Rico's health steadily worsens during winter without heat.

In intermittent flashbacks, Joe's grandmother raises him after his mother abandons him. He has a tragic relationship with Annie, disclosed through flashbacks in which they are attacked and raped by a cowboy gang in a parked car. Annie says, "He's the one. He's the only one," as she is escorted into an ambulance.

Rico tells Joe his father was an illiterate Italian immigrant shoeshiner whose job yielded a bad back and lung damage from shoe polish exposure. Rico learned shoe-shining from his father but considers it degrading and generally refuses to do it. When he breaks into a stand and shines Joe's cowboy boots to attract clients, two police officers arrive and sit with their dirty boots next to Joe's. Rico dreams of moving to Miami, shown in fantasies in which he and Joe frolic on a beach and are pampered at a resort, including a boy polishing Rico's boots.

A Warhol-like filmmaker and an extrovert female artist approach Joe in a diner, taking his Polaroid photograph and inviting him to a Warhol-esque art event (which incorporates actual Warhol superstars Viva, Ultra Violet, Taylor Mead, Joe Dallesandro, and filmmaker Paul Morrissey). Joe and Rico attend, but Rico's poor health and hygiene attract unwanted attention. After mistaking a joint for a cigarette and receiving uppers, Joe starts to hallucinate. He leaves with Shirley, a socialite who pays him $20 for spending the night, but Joe cannot perform sexually. They play Scribbage and the resulting wordplay leads Shirley to suggest that Joe may be gay; suddenly he is able to perform. The next morning, she sets up her female friend as Joe's next client and his career appears to be progressing.

When Joe returns home, Rico is bedridden and feverish. He refuses medical help and begs Joe to put him on a bus to Florida. Desperate, Joe attempts to get money by calling Shirley and then picking up a man in an arcade. He robs the man during a violent encounter in the man's hotel room, brutally beating and apparently smothering him. Joe buys two bus tickets to Florida with the stolen money. Rico again tells Joe that he wants to be called "Rico", not "Ratso", and Joe begins to oblige. During the trip, Rico's health deteriorates further as he becomes incontinent and sweat-drenched. 

At a rest stop, Joe buys new clothing for Rico and himself and discards his cowboy outfit. On the bus, Joe muses that there must be easier careers than hustling, and tells Rico he will get a regular job in Florida. When Rico does not respond, Joe realizes he has died. The driver asks Joe to close Rico's eyelids, saying there is nothing they can do but continue to Miami. The bus riders stare. Teary-eyed, Joe sits with his arm around his friend.

Cast

 Dustin Hoffman as "Ratso" or Enrico Salvatore "Rico" Rizzo
 Jon Voight as Joe Buck
 Sylvia Miles as Cass
 John McGiver as Mr. O'Daniel
 Brenda Vaccaro as Shirley
 Barnard Hughes as Towny
 Ruth White as Sally Buck
 Jennifer Salt as Annie
 Gilman Rankin as Woodsy Niles
 Georgann Johnson as Rich Lady
 Anthony Holland as TV Bishop
 Bob Balaban as Young Student
 Viva as Gretel McAlbertson, the Warhol-like The Factory party/happening giver
 Paul Rossilli (aka Gastone Rossilli) as Hansel McAlbertson, The Factory party/happening filmmaker
 Craig Carrington as Charlie Dealer

Production
The opening scenes were filmed in Big Spring, Texas in 1968. A roadside billboard, stating "If you don't have an oil well...get one!" was shown as the New York-bound bus carrying Joe Buck rolled through Texas. Such advertisements, common in the Southwestern United States in the late 1960s and through the 1970s, promoted Eddie Chiles's Western Company of North America. In the film, Joe stays at the Hotel Claridge, at the southeast corner of Broadway and West 44th Street in Midtown Manhattan. His room overlooked the northern half of Times Square. The building, designed by D. H. Burnham & Company and opened in 1911, was demolished in 1972. A motif featured three times throughout the New York scenes was the sign at the top of the facade of the Mutual of New York (MONY) Building at 1740 Broadway. It was extended into the Scribbage scene with Shirley the socialite, when Joe's incorrect spelling of the word "money" matched that of the sign.

Dustin Hoffman, who played a grizzled veteran of New York's streets, is from Los Angeles. Despite his portrayal of Joe Buck, a character hopelessly out of his element in New York, Jon Voight is a native New Yorker, hailing from Yonkers. Voight was paid "scale", or the Screen Actors Guild minimum wage, for his portrayal of Joe Buck, a concession he willingly made to obtain the part. Harrison Ford auditioned for the role of Joe Buck. Michael Sarrazin, who was Schlesinger's first choice, was cast as Joe Buck, only to be fired when unable to gain release from his contract with Universal.

The character of Shirley, the bohemian socialite Joe hooks up with was allegedly based on socialite and Warhol superstar Edie Sedgwick.

The line "I'm walkin' here!", which reached No. 27 on AFI's 100 Years...100 Movie Quotes, is often said to have been improvised, but producer Jerome Hellman disputes this account on the 2-disc DVD set of Midnight Cowboy. The scene, which originally had Ratso pretend to be hit by a taxi to feign an injury, is written into the first draft of the original script. Hoffman explained it differently on an installment of Bravo's Inside the Actors Studio. He stated that there were many takes to hit the traffic light just right so that they would not have to pause while walking. In that take, the timing was perfect, but a cab nearly hit them. Hoffman wanted to say, "We're filming a movie here!", but stayed in character, allowing the take to be used.

Upon initial review by the Motion Picture Association of America, Midnight Cowboy received a "Restricted" ("R") rating. However, after consulting with a psychologist, executives at United Artists were told to accept an "X" rating, due to the "homosexual frame of reference" and its "possible influence upon youngsters". The film was released with an X rating. The MPAA later broadened the requirements for the "R" rating to allow more content and raised the age restriction from fourteen to seventeen and above. The film was later rated "R" for a reissue in 1971.

It took several hours to shoot the rape scene, and Jennifer Salt recalls the evening as a traumatic ordeal for her. The wardrobe crew had given Jennifer a nude-colored body suit to wear, but the night was so brutally hot and sticky that she quickly stripped it off. "I felt that the most horrible thing in the world was that people were seeing my bare ass, and that was so humiliating I could not even discuss it. And this kid was just on top of me and all over me and it hurt and no one gave a fuck and it was supposed to look like I was being raped. And I was screaming, screaming, and it was traumatic in some way that couldn't be acknowledged."

Reception
Critical response to the film has been largely positive. Vincent Canby's lengthy 1969 New York Times review was blunt: "a slick, brutal (but not brutalizing) movie version of... Herlihy's 1965 novel. It is tough and good in important ways, although its style is oddly romantic and at variance with the laconic material.... As long as the focus is on this world of cafeterias and abandoned tenements, of desperate conjunctions in movie balconies and doorways, of catchup and beans and canned heat, 'Midnight Cowboy' is so rough and vivid that it's almost unbearable.... 'Midnight Cowboy' often seems to be exploiting its material for sensational or comic effect, but it is ultimately a moving experience that captures the quality of a time and a place. It's not a movie for the ages, but, having seen it, you won't ever again feel detached as you walk down West 42d Street, avoiding the eyes of the drifters, stepping around the little islands of hustlers and closing your nostrils to the smell of rancid griddles."

Gene Siskel of the Chicago Tribune said of the film: "I cannot recall a more marvelous pair of acting performances in any one film." In a 25th anniversary retrospective in 1994, Owen Gleiberman of Entertainment Weekly wrote: "Midnight Cowboys peep-show vision of Manhattan lowlife may no longer be shocking, but what is shocking, in 1994, is to see a major studio film linger this lovingly on characters who have nothing to offer the audience but their own lost souls."

Midnight Cowboy holds an 89% approval rating on online review aggregator Rotten Tomatoes as of 2022, with an average rating of 8.50/10, based on 114 reviews. The website's critical consensus states: "John Schlesinger's gritty, unrelentingly bleak look at the seedy underbelly of urban American life is undeniably disturbing, but Dustin Hoffman and Jon Voight's performances make it difficult to turn away."

The Japanese filmmaker Akira Kurosawa cited this movie as one of his 100 favorite films.

Box office
The film opened at the Coronet Theatre in New York City and grossed a house record $61,503 in its first week. In its tenth week of release, the film became number one in the United States with a weekly gross of $550,237 and was the highest-grossing movie in September 1969. The film earned $11 million in rentals in the United States and Canada in 1969 and added a further $5.3 million the following year when it was nominated and won the Academy Award for Best Picture. It eventually earned rentals of $20.5 million.

Television Premiere
More than five years after its theatrical release, Midnight Cowboy premiered on television on November 3, 1974.  Twenty five minutes were edited out of the film due to censorship regulations and a natural desire for broader appeal. Although the cuts were approved by director John Schlesinger, critic Kay Gardella of the New York Daily News stated the film was "hacked up pretty badly."

Accolades

Soundtrack
John Barry composed the score, winning a Grammy for Best Instrumental Theme, though he did not receive an on-screen credit. Fred Neil's song "Everybody's Talkin'" won a Grammy Award for Best Contemporary Vocal Performance, Male for Harry Nilsson. Schlesinger chose the song as its theme, and the song underscores the first act. Other songs considered for the theme included Nilsson's own "I Guess the Lord Must Be in New York City" and Randy Newman's "Cowboy". Bob Dylan wrote "Lay Lady Lay" to serve as the theme song, but did not finish it in time. The movie's main theme, "Midnight Cowboy", featured harmonica by Toots Thielemans, but on its album version it was played by Tommy Reilly. The soundtrack album was released by United Artists Records in 1969.

Track listing

Theme song

 John Barry's version, used on the soundtrack, charted at #116 in 1969. It also charted at #47 in the U.K. in 1980. 
 Johnny Mathis' rendition,  one  of only two known recordings containing lyrics (the other being the Ray Conniff Singers), reached #20 on the U.S. Adult Contemporary chart in the fall of 1969.
 Ferrante & Teicher's version, by far the most successful, reached #10 on the U.S. Billboard Hot 100, #2 Easy Listening chart. Outside the US, it went to #11 in Canada and #91 in Australia in 1970.
 Faith No More released their version as the final track on their 1992 album Angel Dust.

Charts

Certifications

See also
 List of American films of 1969
 List of Academy Award records
 List of films featuring hallucinogens

Notes

References

External links

 
 
 
 
 
 Midnight Cowboy: On the Fringe an essay by Mark Harris at the Criterion Collection

1969 films
1969 drama films
1969 LGBT-related films
1960s buddy drama films
American buddy drama films
American LGBT-related films
Best Film BAFTA Award winners
Best Picture Academy Award winners
1960s English-language films
Films about homelessness
Films about male prostitution in the United States
Films based on American novels
Films directed by John Schlesinger
Films scored by John Barry (composer)
Films set in Florida
Films set in New York City
Films set in Texas
Films shot in Florida
Films shot in New York City
Films shot in Texas
Films whose director won the Best Directing Academy Award
Films whose director won the Best Direction BAFTA Award
Films whose writer won the Best Adapted Screenplay Academy Award
Films whose writer won the Best Screenplay BAFTA Award
LGBT-related buddy drama films
Film controversies
Film controversies in the United States
LGBT-related controversies in film
Obscenity controversies in film
Rating controversies in film
Films with screenplays by Waldo Salt
United States National Film Registry films
1960s American films